Joker's Daughter was originally a musical collaboration between Greek-English singer/songwriter Helena Costas and producer Danger Mouse who released their debut album  The Last Laugh in 2009. Today Helena Costas is backed by a new band and has a new album scheduled for release on 31 October 2011.

History
Born in London but Greek Cypriot by origin, Helena Costas studied violin from ages 7 to 13, then taught herself guitar and keyboards. As she became an adult, her mission came into focus. She wrote songs, and studied music production, and played gigs around London.

Costas first began working with Danger Mouse in 2003, after sending him some home demos.  Trey Reames, DM's Manager at the time, saw her playing at an open mic at  Yo! Sushi in London. Reames started managing her and got DM to produce her record as a 'thank you' for introducing him to Ceelo Green and negotiating their first collaboration (26 inch remix on Lex records) which led to the formation of Gnarls Barkley.

Joker's Daughter's debut album appeared on Team Love Records in 2009, and features Scott Spillane (of Neutral Milk Hotel) on brass instruments. Their debut, The Last Laugh, features Josh Klinghoffer and Steven Nistor.

The single "Mind of Gold" was released on 3 October 2011, and includes the b-side tracks, "Handful of Nothing" and Iron Maiden cover "Infinite Dreams".

The album May Cause Side Effects was released on 7 November 2011

Discography
The Last Laugh (Team Love Records, 2009)
May Cause Side Effects (2011)

References
Footnotes

Further Reading
 Review, Rolling Stone. Archived from the original on 23 February 2013.
 Review, SPIN
 Review, Pitchfork Media
 Review, Billboard. Archived from the original on 23 February 2013.

External links

 

English indie rock groups
Double Six Records artists
Greek indie rock groups